Rab is a surname. Notable people with the surname include:

 A. S. M. Abdur Rab (born 1945), Bangladeshi politician
 Mohammad Abdur Rab (Bir Uttam) (1919–1975), Bangladeshi army officer
 Tibor Rab (born 1955), Hungarian footballer